Adriatic was built at Sunderland in 1810. She sailed to the West Indies and the Cape of Good Hope (CGH, or the Cape). There is no evidence that she sailed to India. She was wrecked at the Cape in 1822.

Career
Adriatic first appeared in Lloyd's Register (LR) in 1811 with R. Stamp, master, Moon & Co., owner, and trade London–Rio de Janeiro.

Lloyd's Register and the Register of Shipping (RS) were only as accurate as shipowners chose to keep them. Also, the registers did not publish at exactly the same time, even when publishing for the same year. Consequently, there are frequently discrepancies between them.

Fate
Adriatic, Rutter, master, sailed from Gravesend on 20 April, bound for the Cape, and arrived there on 14 July. On 21 July a storm drove Adriatic onshore with the loss of a crew member. She was condemned and sold.

Citations and references
Citations

References
 

1810 ships
Age of Sail merchant ships of England
Maritime incidents in July 1822